Steve Lieber (born May 19, 1967) is an American comic book illustrator known for his work on books such as Detective Comics and Hawkman, and the critically acclaimed miniseries Whiteout, which was adapted into a 2009 feature film starring Kate Beckinsale. His other works include the Eisner Award-winning sequel Whiteout: Melt, and the thrillers Shooters and Underground. With writer Nat Gertler, he co-authored The Complete Idiot's Guide to Creating a Graphic Novel.

Lieber has described his career as being about "telling your own unified stories with finality."

Early life
Lieber grew up in the Squirrel Hill section of Pittsburgh in the state of Pennsylvania. He graduated in 1985 from Allderdice High School, studied at Pennsylvania State University but left there before graduating to finish his artistic education at The Kubert School for cartoonists in New Jersey. He studied with Joe Kubert, whom he cites as a significant influence on his career and artistic sensibilities, and graduated in 1990.

Lieber also cites comic artists David Mazzucchelli, Alberto and Enrique Breccia, Milton Caniff, Alex Toth, Howard Chaykin, Alex Raymond, and Jaime Hernandez as major influences. Outside of comics, he cites other painters and illustrators as having influenced his artistic style: Hieronymus Bosch, Howard Pyle, N.C. Wyeth, Joseph Clement Coll, Norman Rockwell, Edgar Degas, Edward Hopper, The Ashcan School painters, Andrew Loomis, Robert Fawcett, and Charles Dana Gibson.

Career
In 1993 Lieber drew Hawkman Annual #1. He subsequently drew 20 issues of the monthly Hawkman series from 1994 to 1995, beginning with issue #5 and ending with issue #27, and at one point, releasing a #0 (which happened between #13 and #14) as a stunt.

Lieber's Hawkman artwork brought him to the attention of Hollywood, where he began doing sketches for the show Batman. He said:

In 1998 Lieber illustrated the four-issue miniseries Whiteout with writer Greg Rucka for Oni Press. The critically acclaimed series, which was described as a "blood-in-the-snow serial killer story", was collected into a trade paperback, and adapted into a 2009 feature film starring Kate Beckinsale and Tom Skerritt.

Lieber attributes his success to persistence, and described himself coming out of school as "averagely skilled", but that he "stayed working in comics longer than some of my contemporaries because I didn't want to do anything else." In addition, Lieber exchanged information and tips from comics creators such as Dwayne McDuffie. Lieber's graphic novel Underground, a story about a park ranger trapped in a cavern, was described as a "spelunking thriller" by Time magazine.

Lieber has been a guest at comic book conventions such as the 2007 San Diego Comic-Con International.

In February 2008, Lieber drew a series of illustrations in which characters from the TV show The Wire were rendered in the style of the TV show The Simpsons, one of which was named by Alan Sepinwall of The Star-Ledger and NJ.com as the "coolest link of the day".

Beginning in September 2009 Lieber illustrated the five-issue miniseries Underground with writer Jeff Parker for Image Comics. The series, about a spelunking park ranger trapped in a cave, was later collected into trade paperback from in early May 2010.

In April 2012 DC/Vertigo published writers Brandon Jerwa and Eric Stephen Trautmann's military thriller graphic novel, Shooters, which was illustrated by Lieber.

In July 2013 Lieber began drawing Superior Foes of Spider-Man for Marvel Comics. The series follows a team of hapless, lesser-known villains from the Spider-Man universe. Lieber has received extensive praise for his work on the series, including a nod on Comics Alliance's "Best of 2013" list. Comics Alliance reviewer Dylan Todd says "Lieber’s at the top of his game here, with a mixture of traditional cape comics styling and a more humane point-of-view that reminds you that these are really just people in suits doing dumb, dangerous things and that they can get hurt at any moment."

Personal life
Lieber and his wife, novelist Sara Ryan, live in Portland, Oregon, where he is a member of Helioscope Studio.

Bibliography

As writer and illustrator
 "The Killing Floor" in Vampirella Comics Magazine #1, Harris Publications, 2003
 "Fell" in Four Letter Worlds 2005

As illustrator
 Conan the Usurper #1-3 (of 3) (writer: Chuck Dixon; additional art: Klaus Janson), Marvel Comics, 1997
 Grendel Tales: The Devil's Apprentice #1-3 (of 3) (writer: Jeffrey Lang) (Dark Horse Comics), 1997
 Whiteout (writer: Greg Rucka), 1999
 "The Mermaid's Necklace" (adapted from the story by Ruth Plumly Thompson; adaptation, Eric Shanower) p. 154-159 in Oz-Story, no. 6, Hungry Tiger Press, Sept. 2000
 Whiteout: Melt (writer: Greg Rucka), 2000
 Winner of the 2000 Eisner Award for Best Limited Series
 Detective Comics #767 "Timeless" (writer: Greg Rucka), DC Comics, 2002
 Collected in Batman: Bruce Wayne: Murderer? (writers: Ed Brubaker, Greg Rucka, Devin Grayson, Chuck Dixon, Kelley Puckett), 2002
 Me and Edith Head (writer: Sara Ryan) in Cricket v.4 no. 1 (Carus Publishing), 2002
 Nominated for 2002 Eisner Award for Best Short Story
 reprinted as a standalone, self-published volume, 2002
 Family Reunion (writer: Sean Stewart), 2004
 On the Road to Perdition, two issues:
 #2 of 3 "Sanctuary" (writer: Max Allan Collins), 2003
 #3 of 3 "Detour" (writer: Max Allan Collins, penciller: José Luis García-López), 2004
 Collected in Road to Perdition 2: On the Road (DC Comics), 2004
 Flytrap - Episode One: Juggling Act (writer: Sara Ryan), 2005
 Gotham Central #37 (writer: Greg Rucka), 2005
 Civil War: Frontline #1-10 (writer: Paul Jenkins, additional art: Ramon Bachs), 2006–2007
 Thunderbolts: Desperate Measures #1 (writer: Paul Jenkins, color: June Chung), 2007
 Underground (writer: Jeff Parker, color: Ron Chan, 5-issue limited series, Image Comics, 2009–2010, tpb, 128 pages, 2010)
 Alabaster Wolves #1-5 (writer: Caitlín R. Kiernan), 2012 
 Quantum and Woody Must Die! #1-4 (writer: James Asmus), 2015
 Lazarus X+66 #1 (writer: Greg Rucka), 2017

As a contributing illustrator
 Twilight Zone #7 and 11, NOW Comics (1992)
 "An Edwardian Nursery" (writer: Jeffrey Lang) in Dark Horse Presents #77, 1993
 G.I. Joe: A Real American Hero #141 "Sucker Punch" (writer: Larry Hama; additional art: various), Marvel Comics, 1993
 Hawkeye #7 (writer: Matt Fraction; additional art: Jesse Alan Hamm), Marvel Comics, 2013
 Hawkman Annual 01 "Bad Blood", (writer: John Ostrander; additional art: various), DC Comics, 1993
 Hawkman #0 "Eyes of the Hawk, Prologue: Old Scores", (Writer: William Messner-Loebs, inker: Curt Shoultz; colorist: Buzz Setzer; letterer: Albert T. DeGuzman), DC Comics, 1994
 Hawkman #5 "A Rage of Hawks", (writer: John Ostrander; inker:  Rick Magyar; colorists: Matt Webb; letterer: Albert T. DeGuzman) DC Comics, 1994
 Hawkman #6 "War Cry", (writer: John Ostrander; inker: Rick Magyar; colorists: Buzz Setzer; letterer: Albert T. DeGuzman) DC Comics, 1994
 Hawkman #9-13 "Godspawn", (writers: William Messner-Loebs & Steven T. Seagle; additional art: various),  DC Comics, 1994
 Hawkman #14-17 "Eyes of the Hawk", (writer: William Messner-Loebs; inker: Curt Shoultz; colorists: Buzz Setzer; letterer: Albert T. DeGuzman), DC Comics, 1994–1995
 "Legacy" in Marvel Comics Presents #147 (writer: Mariano Nicieza; colorist: Marianne Lightle; letterer: Loretta Krol), Marvel Comics, 1994
 Medal of Honor #2 (writer: Doug Murray; various artists), Dark Horse, 1994
 "Roadways" (writer: Jeffrey Lang;  inked by Steve Lieber; additional artists: Ted Slampyak, John Drury, Tommy Berg; edited by Katherine Fritz), Cult Press, 1994.
 "Sgt. Desmond Doss: The Bible Tells Me So" (writer: Doug Murray) in Medal of Honor Special, Dark Horse Comics, 1994
 "Sir John's Passing" (writer: Jeffrey Lang) in Dark Horse Presents #88, 1994
 Detective Comics #685-686 "War of the Dragons" (writer: Chuck Dixon; inker: Klaus Janson; colorist: John Wellington; letterer: John Costanza), DC Comics, 1995
 Hawkman #19 "Madness in Motown", (writer: William Messner-Loebs; inker: Curt Shoultz; colorists: Buzz Setzer)DC Comics, 1995
 Hawkman #20 "Clash of Wings", (writer: William Messner-Loebs; inker: Curt Shoultz; colorists: Buzz Setzer), DC Comics, 1995
 Hawkman #22 "Storm Over Thanagar: The Way of the Warrior Part 3", (writer: William Messner-Loebs; inker: Curt Shoultz; letterer: Bob Pinaha), DC Comics, 1995
 Hawkman #23 "Essential Warfare: The Way of the Warrior Part 6", (writer: William Messner-Loebs; inker: Curt Shoultz; colorist: Trish Mulvihill, letterer: Bob Pinaha), DC Comics, 1995
 Hawkman #24-25 "Hunting the Lion", (writer: William Messner-Loebs; inker: Curt Shoultz; letterer: Bob Pinaha), DC Comics, 1995
 Hawkman #26 "Fear Visits", (writer: William Messner-Loebs; inker: Curt Shoultz; letterer: Bob Pinaha), DC Comics, 1995
 Hawkman #27 "Hawkmad!", (writer: William Messner-Loebs; letterer: Bob Pinaha), DC Comics, 1995
 Robin #17 "The Silk Dragons" (writer: Chuck Dixon; additional art: (Enrique Villagran, John Wellington, Tim Harkins), DC Comics, 1995
 Species #2 (of 4) (writer: Dennis Feldman; additional artists: various), (Dark Horse), 1995
 The Big Book of Hoaxes (writers: Various), 1996
 The Big Book of Thugs (writer: Joel Rose), 1996
 Neil Gaiman's Lady Justice #8-11 (writer: C.J. Henderson; colorists: Heroic Age & David Hillman; letterer: Ken Bruzenak), Tekno Comics, 1996
 The Big Book of Losers (writers: Paul Kirchner, Nancy A. Collins, Irwin Chusid), 1997
 The Big Book of Martyrs (writer: John Wagner), 1997
 The Big Book of Scandal (writer: Jonathan Vankin), 1997
 The Big Book of the Unexplained (writer: Doug Moench), 1997
 "A brother to dragons" in Margaret Weis' Testament of the Dragon : an Illustrated Novel (writer: Margaret Weis) (HarperPrism), 1997
 "Heavy Water" in Two-fisted Science (writer: Jim Ottaviani) (General Tektronics Labs), 1997
 Second edition G.T. Labs, 2001
 The Big Book of the Weird Wild West (writers: John Whalen, Deb Picker, Richard Klaw, Ben Ostrander), 1998
 "A Great Metropolitan Newspaper" in Superman Secret Files & Origins (writer: Roger Stern; additional art: Joes Marzan Jr., Tom McCraw), DC Comics, 1998
 Heroes Reborn: Rebel #1 "Wild Blue" (writer: Joe Kelly, additional art: various), Marvel Comics, 2000
 pinup in Finder: Sin-Eater, Part 2 by Carla Speed McNeil, Lightspeed Press, 2000, 
 Batman: Turning Points #1 (writer: Greg Rucka, pencil & ink: Steve Lieber, letters, colors and edits: Willie Schubert, Tom McCraw, Matt Idleson), DC Comics, 2001
 Detective Comics #758 "Unknowing - Part 1" (writers: Ed Brubaker & Greg Rucka; additional art: Shawn Martinbrough), DC Comics, 2001
 "Death" in Fallout: J. Robert Oppenheimer, Leo Szilard, and the Political Science of the Atomic Bomb (writer: Jim Ottaviani), 2001
 Harley Quinn: Our Worlds at War #1 "Our Fighting Forces" (writer: Karl Kesel; additional art: various), DC Comics, 2001
 Pantheon #8-9 (writer: Bill Willingham; additional art: various), Lone Star Press, 2001
 Superman #174 "Every Blade of Grass" (writer: Jeph Loeb; additional artists: Tanya Horie, Richard Horie), DC Comics, 2001
 Swamp Thing #9 "In the Air, on Land and Sea..." (writer: Brian K. Vaughan, additional art: various), Vertigo (DC Comics), 2001
 Transmetropolitan: Filth of the City (writer: Warren Ellis), 2001
 "The Wake" (writer: Jeffrey Lang) in Star Trek: Special, (Wildstorm) 2001
 Xeno's Arrow #2, 2001
 "The Glittering World" (writer: David Fury); colorist: Matt Hollingsworth) in Buffy the Vampire Slayer: Tales of the Slayers, Dark Horse Comics, 2001
 Detective Comics #768-770 "Purity" and #771 "Access" (writer: Greg Rucka; additional art: various), DC Comics, 2002
 Collected in Batman: Bruce Wayne: Fugitive Volume 2, DC Comics, 2003
 Detective Comics #773-774 "Atonement" (writer: Greg Rucka; inker: Mark McKenna; colorist: Jason Wright; letterer: Todd Klein), DC Comics, 2002
 Collected in Batman: Bruce Wayne: Fugitive Volume 3, DC Comics, 2003
 Batman: Family #7-8 (writer: John Francis Moore; additional art: various), DC Comics, 2003
 The Interman 1 (writer: Jeff Parker), 2003
 "Family Story" (writer: Sara Ryan, colorist: Jeff Parker) in Hellboy: Weird Tales #3, 2003
 Collected in Hellboy: Weird Tales 1 (Dark Horse), 2003
 "Prison Break" (writer: Kevin McCarthy; colorist: Jeff Parker) in The Amazing Adventures of the Escapist 1,  Dark Horse Comics, 2004
 cover art for Lady Churchill's Rosebud Wristlet, no. 15, (ed. by Gavin Grant and Kelly Link), (Small Beer Press), 2005
 Gotham Central #32 "Nature" (writer: Greg Rucka; colorist: Lee Loughridge; letterer: Clem Robins), DC Comics, 2005
 ""Thoughts on a Winter Morning"" in Negative Burn: Winter 2005 (writer: Kurt Busiek), Desperado Publishing (Image Comics) 2005
 pinup in The Surrogates #3 "Revelations" (writer: Robert Venditti; additional art: various), Top Shelf Productions, 2005
 Gotham Central #37 "Sunday Bloody Sunday" (writer: Greg Rucka; colorist: Lee Loughridge; letterer: Clem Robins), DC Comics, 2006
 METHo.d. (writer: Clifford Meth; various artists) Aardwolf Publishing, 2006
 Bat Lash #6 #32 “Nature” (writer: Sergio Aragones), DC Comics, 2008

As co-author
 The Complete Idiot's Guide to Creating a Graphic Novel, with Nat Gertler, Alpha Books , 2004

As interviewer
 "Another Survivors' Tale : The Harvey Pekar Interview". Interview conducted by Jim Ottaviani and Steve Lieber. p. 117-125 in Hogan's Alley, v. 1, no. 4, 1997
 "The Authoritative Frank Stack, or, Foolbert Sturgeon on Jesus, Crumb, and Cancer". Interview conducted by Jim Ottaviani and Steve Lieber. p. 92-110 in The Comics Journal, no. 189, Aug. 1996

References

External links

Lieber's profile/portfolio on the Periscope Studio site
Allass, Marcia. "My Concern Is Telling A Story: Steve Lieber". Sequential Tart. 1999.
Wright, Brendan (September 2, 2009). "Up North and Underground with Steve Lieber". The Wright Opinion.

1967 births
Living people
American graphic novelists
American comics artists
The Kubert School alumni
Artists from Portland, Oregon
American male novelists
Artists from Pittsburgh
Inkpot Award winners
Taylor Allderdice High School alumni